The Tebu Mountain slender-toed gecko (Hemiphyllodactylus tehtarik) is a species of gecko. It is endemic to Peninsular Malaysia.

References

Hemiphyllodactylus
Reptiles described in 2013
Endemic fauna of Malaysia
Reptiles of Malaysia